The parish of Saint Thomas ("St. Thomas") is found in the centre of Barbados. It is one of only two landlocked parishes in the island, the other being Saint George to the south.

Saint Thomas is represented in the House of Assembly of Barbados by Cynthia Forde. 

The area of Sturges in St. Thomas contains a number of broadcast antennas for the island.  Included one which fell onto nearby properties in 2018.

Geography

Populated places
There are no cities in St. Thomas. The central village of the parish is Welchman Hall. The eponymous St. Thomas Church is located west of Rock Hall on Highway 2A. The majority of the population lives in the extreme southwest of the parish, in the catchment area of Bridgetown. The biggest places there are Welches, Redmans and Arthur's Seat. Shop Hill, White Hill and Edgehill are centrally located in the southwest. Welchman Hall is in the center, Rock Hall in the West and Clifton Hill in the east. The north is sparsely populated.

The parish contains the following major villages:

Smaller villages and hamlets are:

Parishes bordering Saint Thomas
 Saint Andrew - Northeast
 Saint George - Southeast
 Saint James - West
 Saint Joseph - East
 Saint Michael - Southwest

Education
In 1997, the Government of Barbados under the Ministry of Education in an attempt to create more spaces for the increase in entrants into secondary schools, opened the St. Thomas Secondary School, the precursor of the Lester Vaughan Secondary School, named after a distinguished Barbadian who assisted in the transformation of the educational sector as well as wrote the National Pledge of Barbados.
To date, the Lester Vaughan School is the youngest secondary school and one of the most technologically advanced in the island.

The Barbados Association for Children With Intellectual Challenges operates the Challenor School for both children and adults with mental retardation.

Places of interest
 Clifton Hill Moravian Church
 Sharon Moravian Church
 Harrison's Cave

References

External links 
 
 

 
Parishes of Barbados